Sword and planet is a subgenre of science fantasy that features rousing adventure stories set on other planets, and usually featuring humans as protagonists. The name derives from the heroes of the genre engaging their adversaries in hand-to-hand combat primarily with simple melée weapons such as swords, even in a setting that often has advanced technology. Although there are works that herald the genre, such as Percy Greg's Across the Zodiac (1880) and Edwin Lester Arnold's Lieut. Gullivar Jones: His Vacation (1905; published in the US in 1964 as Gulliver of Mars), the prototype for the genre is A Princess of Mars by Edgar Rice Burroughs originally serialized by All-Story in 1912 as "Under the Moons of Mars".

The genre predates the mainstream popularity of science fiction proper, and does not necessarily feature any scientific rigor, being instead romantic tales of high adventure. For example, little thought is given to explaining why the environment of the alien planet is compatible with life from Earth, just that it does in order to allow the hero to move about and interact with the natives. Native technology will often break the known laws of physics.

The genre tag "sword and planet" was constructed to mimic the terms sword and sorcery, and sword and sandal. The phrase appears to have first been coined in the 1960s by Donald A. Wollheim, editor of Ace Books, and later of DAW Books at a time when the genre was undergoing a revival. Both Ace Books and DAW Books were instrumental in bringing much of the earlier pulp sword and planet stories back into print, as well as publishing a great deal of new, imitative work by a new generation of authors.

There is a fair amount of overlap between sword and planet and planetary romance, although some works are considered to belong to one and not the other. Influenced by the likes of A Princess of Mars yet more modern and technologically savvy, sword and planet more directly imitates the conventions established by Burroughs in the Mars series. That is to say that the hero is alone as the only human being from Earth, swords are the weapon of choice, and while the alien planet has some advanced technology, it is used only in limited applications to advance the plot or increase the grandeur of the setting. In general, the alien planet will seem to be more medieval and primitive than Earth. This leads to anachronistic situations such as flying ships held aloft by anti-gravity technology, while ground travel is done by riding domesticated native animals.

History 

Stories in the sword and planet genre fall primarily into two chronological classes.

Beginnings 
The first includes the stories of Burroughs himself and his early imitators, of whom Otis Adelbert Kline was the most significant.

In A Princess of Mars, John Carter, a Confederate officer and soldier, has taken up prospecting in Arizona after the war to regain his fortune. Under mysterious circumstances, he is transported to Mars, called Barsoom by its inhabitants. There he encounters savage and monstrous aliens, a beautiful princess, and a life of adventure and wonder. Burroughs followed up this first book with several more Barsoom stories, and another series that could be considered Sword & Planet, featuring as hero Carson Napier and his adventures on Venus, natively known as Amtor. Burroughs' Pellucidar series could arguably be considered sword-and-(inner) planet, as it follows most of the plot conventions described below.

Modern development 
The second and larger group includes authors who began to write Burroughs pastiches from the mid-1960s to early 1970s. Such authors included Lin Carter and Michael Moorcock. Except for continuations of the extended Dray Prescot and Gor sequences, and occasional parodies of earlier series, not many new works in the genre have appeared from major publishers since 1980. One notable exception are two books written by S. M. Stirling and published by Tor: The Sky People (2006) and In the Courts of the Crimson Kings (2008). However, smaller presses have continued to issue new works in the genre, most notably Wildside Press, primarily through The Borgo Press imprint. In 2007, for example, Wildside/Borgo published a new book in Charles Nuetzel's Torlo Hannis of Noomas series, and printed the Talera trilogy by Charles Allen Gramlich.

Form 

Burroughs established a set of conventions that were followed fairly closely by most other entries in the sword and planet genre. The typical first book in a sword and planet series uses some or all of the following plot points:

A tough but chivalrous male protagonist, from Earth of a period not too distant from our own, finds himself transported to a distant world. The transportation may be via astral projection, teleportation, time travel, or any similar form of scientific magic, but should not imply that travel between worlds is either easy or common. The Earthman thus finds himself the sole representative of his own race on an alien planet. This planet is at a pre-modern, even barbaric stage of civilization, but may here and there have remarkable technologies that hint at a more advanced past. There is no obligation for the physical properties or biology of the alien planet to follow any scientific understanding of the potential conditions of habitable worlds; in general, the conditions will be earth-like, but with variations such as a different-colored sun or different numbers of moons. A lower gravity may be invoked to explain such things as large flying animals or people, or the superhuman strength of the hero, but will otherwise be ignored. (A Princess of Mars, however, when it was first written did loosely follow the most optimistic theories about Mars—e.g., those of Percival Lowell who imagined a dying, dried-up Mars watered by a network of artificial canals).

Not long after discovering his predicament, the Earthman finds himself caught in a struggle between two or more factions, nations, or species. He sides, of course, with the nation with the prettiest woman, who will sometimes turn out to be a princess. Before he can set about seriously courting her, however, she is kidnapped by a fiendish villain or villains. The Earthman, taking up his sword (the local weapon of choice, which he has a talent with), sets out on a quest to recover the woman and wallop the kidnappers. On the way, he crosses wild and inhospitable terrain, confronts savage animals and monsters, discovers lost civilizations ruled by cruel tyrants or wicked priests, and will repeatedly engage in swashbuckling sword-fights, be imprisoned, daringly escape and rescue other prisoners, and kill any men or beasts who stand in his way. At the end of the story he will defeat the villain and free the captive princess, only to find another crisis emerging that will require all his wit and muscle, but will not be resolved until the next thrilling novel in the adventures of...!.

List of works 

What follows is admittedly incomplete, but is a listing of some of the more important and more remembered representatives of the genre. Some of the dates are reprint dates, not date of original publication.

Edgar Rice Burroughs

The Barsoom Series (a.k.a. The John Carter of Mars Series) 
 A Princess of Mars (serial 1912/novel 1917)
 The Gods of Mars (1913/1918)
 The Warlord of Mars (1913–1914/1919)
 Thuvia, Maid of Mars (1916/1920)
 The Chessmen of Mars (1922/1922)
 The Master Mind of Mars (1927/1928)
 A Fighting Man of Mars (1930/1931)
 Swords of Mars (1934–1935/1936)
 Synthetic Men of Mars (1939/1940)
 Llana of Gathol (1941/1948)
 Skeleton Men of Jupiter (1943/1964) - published in John Carter of Mars (1964) together with the non-ERB juvenile John Carter and the Giant of Mars (1941).

The Amtor Series (a.k.a. The Carson Napier of Venus Series) 
 Pirates of Venus (1934)
 Lost on Venus (1935)
 Carson of Venus (1939)
 Escape on Venus (1946)
 The Wizard of Venus (1970)

The Moon Maid Series 
 The Moon Maid (1923)
 The Moon Men / Under the Red Flag (1925)
 The Red Hawk (1925)

Beyond the Farthest Star (novel) 
 Adventure on Poloda (1942)
 Tangor Returns (1964)

Alex Raymond 
 Flash Gordon (1934)

Roger Sherman Hoar (as Ralph Milne Farley)

Venus series 
 The Radio Man (1924)  An Earthman on Venus
 The Radio Beasts (1925)
 The Radio Planet (1926)
 The Radio Man Returns (2005) includes The Radio Minds of Mars

John Ulrich Giesy

Palos series 
 Palos of the Dog Star Pack (1918)
 The Mouthpiece of Zitu (1919)
 Jason, Son of Jason (1921)

Alexei Tolstoy 
 Aelita (1923)

Otis Adelbert Kline

Venus series 
 Planet of Peril (1929)
 Prince of Peril (1930)
 The Port of Peril (1932) aka Buccaneers of Venus

Mars series 
 The Swordsman of Mars (1933)
 The Outlaws of Mars (1933)

Gustave Le Rouge 
 The Vampires of Mars (1908) aka The Prisoner of the Planet Mars
 The War of the Vampires (1909)

Edmond Hamilton

Stuart Merrick series 
 Kaldar, World of Antares (1933)
 The Snake-men of Kaldar (1933)
 The Great Brain of Kaldar (1935)

Robert E. Howard 
 Almuric (1939/1964 - started c. 1936, allegedly completed posthumously by Otis Adelbert Kline)

Manly Wade Wellman 
 Sojarr of Titan (1941)

Arkady and Boris Strugatsky 
 Hard to Be a God (1964)

Gardner F. Fox

Llarn series 
 Warrior of Llarn (1964)
 Thief of Llarn (1966)

Michael Moorcock

Sojan the Swordsman series (juvenile short stories) 
 Sojan the Swordsman (1957)
 Sojan, Swordsman of Zylor (1957)
 Sojan and the Sea of Demons (1957)
 Sojan and the Plain of Mystery (1958)
 Sojan and the Sons of the Snake-God (1958)
 Sojan and the Devil Hunters of Norj (1958)
 Klan the Spoiler (1958)
 Dek of Noothar (1957)
 Rens Karto of Bersnol (1958)

Kane of Old Mars series (writing as Edward Powys Bradbury) 
 Warrior of Mars (1965) aka City of the Beast
 Blades of Mars (1965) aka Lord of the Spiders
 Barbarians of Mars (1965) aka Masters of the Pit

Don Lawrence (comic book artist)

The Trigan Empire series, written by Mike Butterworth (1965–1982)

Storm series, stories by Lawrence, Martin Lodewijk and others (1977–)

John Frederick Lange (writing as John Norman)

Gor series 
 Tarnsman of Gor (1966)
 Outlaw of Gor (1967)
 Priest-Kings of Gor (1968)
 Nomads of Gor (1969)
 Assassin of Gor (1970)
 Raiders of Gor (1971)
 Captive of Gor (1972)
 Hunters of Gor (1974)
 Marauders of Gor (1975)
 Tribesmen of Gor (1976)
 Slave Girl of Gor (1977)
 Beasts of Gor (1978)
 Explorers of Gor (1979)
 Fighting Slave of Gor (1980)
 Rogue of Gor (1981)
 Guardsman of Gor (1981)
 Savages of Gor (1982)
 Blood Brothers of Gor (1982)
 Kajira of Gor (1983)
 Players of Gor (1984)
 Mercenaries of Gor (1985)
 Dancer of Gor (1985)
 Renegades of Gor (1986)
 Vagabonds of Gor (1987)
 Magicians of Gor (1988)
 Witness of Gor (2001)
 Prize of Gor (2008)
 Kur of Gor (2009)
 Swordsmen of Gor (2010)
 Mariners of Gor (2011)
 Conspirators of Gor (2012)
 Smugglers of Gor (Oct 2012)
 Rebels of Gor (Oct 2013)
 Plunder of Gor (June 2016)
 Quarry of Gor (June 2019)
 Avengers of Gor (May 2021)
 Warriors of Gor (August 2022)

Philip José Farmer

The World of Tiers series 
 The Maker of Universes (1965)
 The Gates of Creation (1966)
 A Private Cosmos (1968)
 Behind the Walls of Terra (1970)
 The Lavalite World (1977)
 Red Orc's Rage (1991)
 More Than Fire (1993)

Julius Schwartz 
 Adam Strange (1958) DC Comics character

Richard Corben

Den Series, a comics character featured in Heavy Metal and other publications 
 "Neverwhere" (1978, 1985, 1991)
 "Muvovum" (1984, 1991)
 "Children of Fire" (1992)
 "Dreams" (1992)
 "Elements" (1992)

Mike Resnick

Ganymede series 
 The Goddess of Ganymede (1968)
 Pursuit on Ganymede (1968)

Charles Nuetzel

Torlo Hannis series 
 Warriors of Noomas (1969)
 Raiders of Noomas (1969)
 Slavegirl of Noomas (2007) (With Heidi Garrett)

Lin Carter

Callisto series 
 Jandar of Callisto (1972)
 Black Legion of Callisto (1972)
 Sky Pirates of Callisto (1973)
 Mad Empress of Callisto (1975)
 Mind Wizards of Callisto (1975)
 Lankar of Callisto (1975)
 Ylana of Callisto (1977)
 Renegade of Callisto (1978)

Green Star Series 
 Under the Green Star (1972)
 When the Green Star Calls (1973)
 By the Light of the Green Star (1974)
 As the Green Star Rises (1975)
 In the Green Star's Glow (1976)

Mysteries of Mars series 
 The Man Who Loved Mars (1973)
 The Valley Where Time Stood Still (1974)
 The City Outside the World (1977)
 Down to a Sunless Sea (1984)

Kenneth Bulmer (writing as Alan Burt Akers and as Dray Prescot)

Dray Prescot series 
 Transit to Scorpio (1972)
 The Suns of Scorpio (1973)
 Warrior of Scorpio (1973)
 Swordships of Scorpio (1973)
 Prince of Scorpio (1974)
 Manhounds of Antares (1974)
 Arena of Antares (1974)
 Fliers of Antares (1975)
 Bladesman of Antares (1975)
 Avenger of Antares (1975)
 Armada of Antares (1976)
 The Tides of Kregen (1976)
 Renegade of Kregen (1976)
 Krozair of Kregen (1977)
 Secret Scorpio (1977)
 Savage Scorpio (1978)
 Captive Scorpio (1978)
 Golden Scorpio (1978)
 A Life for Kregen (1979)
 A Sword for Kregen (1979)
 A Fortune for Kregen (1979)
 A Victory for Kregen (1980)
 Beasts of Antares (1980)
 Rebel of Antares (1980)
 Legions of Antares (1981)
 Allies of Antares (1981)
 Mazes of Scorpio (1982)
 Delia of Vallia (1982)
 Fires of Scorpio (1983)
 Talons of Scorpio (1983)
 Masks of Scorpio (1984)
 Seg the Bowman (1984)
 Werewolves of Kregen (1985)
 Witches of Kregen (1985)
 Storm Over Vallia (1985)
 Omens of Kregen (1985)
 Warlord of Antares (1988)
 Scorpio Reborn (Wiedergeborens Scorpio, 1991)
 Scorpio Assassin (Meuchelmörder von Scorpio, 1992)
 Scorpio Invasion (Invasion von Scorpio, 1992)
 Scorpio Ablaze (Scorpio in Flammen, 1992)
 Scorpio Drums (Die Trommeln von Scorpio, 1992)
 Scorpio Triumph (Der Triumpf von Scorpio, 1993)
 Intrigue of Antares (Die Intrige von Antares, 1993)
 Gangs of Antares (Die Banditen von Antares, 1994)
 Demons of Antares (Die Dämonen von Antares, 1994)
 Scourge of Antares (Die Geißel von Antares, 1994)
 Challenge of Antares (Die Fehde von Antares, 1995)
 Wrath of Antares (Der Zorn von Antares, 1996)
 Shadows over Kregen (Schatten über Kregen, 1996)
 Murder on Kregen (Mord auf Kregen, 1997)
 Turmoil on Kregen (Aufruhr auf Kregen, 1997)
 Betrayal on Kregen (Verrat auf Kregen, 1998)

Leigh Brackett

Eric John Stark series 
 Eric John Stark: Outlaw of Mars (1982)
 The Secret of Sinharat (1964 - revision of Queen of the Martian Catacombs (1949))
 People of the Talisman (1964 - revision of Black Amazon of Mars (1951))
 Enchantress of Venus (aka City of the Lost Ones) (1949)
 The Book of Skaith (1976)
 The Ginger Star (1974)
 The Hounds of Skaith (1974)
 The Reavers of Skaith (1976)

Other 
 The Sword of Rhiannon (Magazine version "Sea-Kings of Mars")
 Lorelei of the Red Mist (with Ray Bradbury)
 Shadow over Mars

Gerard F. Conway (writing as Wallace Moore)

Balzan Of The Cat People series 
 The Blood Stones (1975)
 The Caves of Madness (1975)
 The Lights of Zetar (1975)

Andrew J. Offutt 
 Ardor on Aros (1973)
 Chieftain of Andor aka Clansman of Andor (1976)

Mike Sirota

Dannus/Reglathium series 
 the Prisoner of Reglathium (1978)
 the Conquerors of Reglathium (1978)
 The Caves of Reglathium (1978)
 the Dark Straits of Reglathium (1978)
 Slaves of Reglathium

Jack Vance

Planet of Adventure
 City of the Chasch (1968)
 Servants of the Wankh (1969)
 The Dirdir (1969)
 The Pnume (1970)

David J. Lake

Xuma Series 
 The Gods of Xuma (1978)
 Warlords of Xuma (1983)

Charles Allen Gramlich

Talera Series 
 Swords of Talera (2007)
 Wings Over Talera (2007)
 Witch of Talera (2007)
 Wraith of Talera (2016)
 Gods of Talera (2016)

Janet Morris

"The Silistra Series"

Dan Simmons

Ilium/Olympos 
 The Ilium/Olympos (2003/2005) cycle has elements of this genre, staging the Trojan war myth on a far-future terraformed planet Mars.

Comics 
 Flash Gordon
 Masters of the Universe
 Storm (Don Lawrence)
 The Trigan Empire

Animated cartoons 
 Blackstar (TV series), 1981 cartoon with many elements of the genre represented.
 Masters of the Universe, a media franchise. While the protagonist of the series is not from Earth, his mother comes from Earth.
 ThunderCats, a media franchise. The characters are from Thundera and crash-land on Third Earth.
 The Pirates of Dark Water (TV Series) 1991–1992 is a fantasy animated series produced by Hanna-Barbera.

Animated feature films 
  Wizards 1977
 Heavy Metal 1981
 Starchaser: The Legend of Orin 1985

See also
Technofantasy

References

Science fantasy